Gotthard Johann von Knorring (1744 or 1746  (Bogdan Fyodorovich Knorring) was a Baltic German who was a soldier in the Russian Army, rising to become a general.

Biography
He was born in 1744 or 1746.–1825) Knorring grew up on Ervita manor, in the Governorate of Estonia. He was appointed general quartermaster in 1788 and had active duty during the war against Sweden (1788–1790). In 1792-1794 he participated in the campaign in Poland. When Paul I started his reign, Knorring withdrew from the military for some years. He participated in the war against France in 1807 but was recalled due to disagreements with the commanding general, Levin August von Bennigsen. In December 1808 he was appointed commander of the Russian forces in Finland after Friedrich Wilhelm von Buxhoevden and under his command the Russian forces crossed the Gulf of Bothnia on the ice and invaded Sweden proper. Shortly after, in March 1809 the command of the Russian forces transferred to Michael Andreas Barclay de Tolly. He died in 1825.

See also
There was another General Knorring, his brother Karl Knorring , who was involved in the Russian annexation of Georgia in 1801.

References

External links 
Genealogisches Handbuch der baltischen Ritterschaften 

1746 births
1825 deaths
People from Järva Parish
People from the Governorate of Estonia
Baltic-German people
Russian nobility
Imperial Russian Army generals
Russian commanders of the Napoleonic Wars
Russian military personnel of the Finnish War
Russian people of the Kościuszko Uprising
Recipients of the Order of St. George of the Second Degree